The Vladimir Lenin monument in Kyiv was a statue dedicated to Vladimir Lenin, the founder of the Soviet Union in Kyiv, the capital of Ukraine.  The larger than life-size (3.45 meters [11.32 feet]) Lenin monument was built by Russian sculptor Sergey Merkurov from the same red Karelian stone as Lenin's Mausoleum. It was displayed at the 1939 New York World's Fair and erected on Kyiv's main Khreshchatyk Street (at the intersection of Shevchenko Boulevard, opposite the Bessarabsky Market) on 5 December 1946.

The statue was toppled from its pedestal and crushed by protesters on 8 December 2013, as part of the Euromaidan events, when many other Soviet statues were toppled. The plinth remains in place, and has become at times a site of political artwork, and arguments. Since 2016 various sculptures or installations have been exhibitioned in front of the plinth.

Since 2015 (all) monuments connected with communist themes and/or persons are illegal in Ukraine.

Post-Soviet period
According to the decree of the former President of Ukraine, Viktor Yushchenko, this monument of the Soviet Union and the associated Communist period should have been removed after Ukraine gained independence. Nevertheless, due to the resistance of the Communist Party of Ukraine, whose members were elected to Verhovna Rada, the last Kyiv monument to Lenin was left standing.

Since the fall of Soviet rule, the monument survived numerous vandalizing attempts which led to both increased policing of the area and frequent vigilance by pro-Soviet activists.

Demolition

On 1 December 2013, a group of masked men attempted to topple the statue during the surge of the Euromaidan protests. Police immediately reacted by deploying a small Berkut riot police unit which was attacked, overwhelmed and forced to flee. Euromaidan leaders immediately denounced both the monument attempt and the clash with police as an action of unaffiliated "provocateurs".

Later, on 8 December 2013, several Ukrainian individuals subsequently claimed to be affiliated with the Svoboda political party toppled the statue, as Kyiv police silently looked on. The statue then broke from impact with the ground.

After the fall of the Lenin statue the crowd began to sing the national anthem of Ukraine. Later, pieces of the monument were picked up by protesters as souvenirs.

Response
The removal or destruction of Lenin monuments and statues gained particular momentum after the destruction of the Kyiv Lenin statue. Under the motto "Ленінопад" (Leninopad, translated into English as "Leninfall"), activists pulled down a dozen communist monuments in the Kyiv region, Zhytomyr, Khmelnytskyi, and elsewhere, or damaged them during the course of the EuroMaidan protests into spring of 2014. In other cities and towns, monuments were removed by organised heavy equipment and transported to scrapyards or dumps.

Political response
A member of the Ukrainian parliament from the party UDAR, Valeriy Karpuntsov, announced that Ukrainian police had started arrests of people present in the area during the fall of the last monument to Lenin in Kyiv.

The governor of Kharkiv Oblast, Mykhailo Dobkin, tweeted on 8 December 2013 about starting a crowdfunding campaign to restore the monument: "Tomorrow I will open the account for restoration of the monument to Lenin in Kyiv… Everybody, who hates Hutsuls for their stupidity, join". He stated that he would allocate the sum of ₴100,000 for the restoration of the monument.

Public opinion
Most residents of Kyiv (69%) had a negative attitude to the removal of Lenin's monument during the mass protest actions, while 13% had a positive attitude and 15% remained indifferent.

Notable figures
Singer Ruslana (one of the leading figures of the protests) was critical of the event, saying, "We do not need any barbaric actions. We condemn acts of vandalism, savagery, violence and anything that can divide and split Ukraine [...] doubling monuments and calls for aggression is nothing but a movement in the opposite direction of European integration and humane society."

Later use of the site
On 15 May 2015, President of Ukraine Petro Poroshenko signed a bill into law that started a six-month period for the removal of all communist themed monuments in Ukraine.

Although the statue has been removed, the monument's plinth has remained in place. This plinth has become at times a site of political artwork, and arguments. Since 2016 various sculptures or installations have been exhibitioned in front of the plinth.

Gallery

See also
Demolition of monuments to Vladimir Lenin in Ukraine 
List of communist monuments damaged during Euromaidan
List of communist monuments in Ukraine
List of statues of Vladimir Lenin
Monument of the Great October Revolution
Decommunization in Ukraine

References

External links

Full Video of Protesters In Kyiv Toppling, Decapitating Lenin Statue
Ukraine Protest: Tearing Down Lenin's Statue in Kyiv – New York Times
BBC | Ukraine commits statue-cide
Map of Lenin statues decapitated or totally fallen during the Leninopad in Ukraine 

Euromaidan
2013 in Ukraine
Demolished buildings and structures in Kyiv
History of Kyiv
Monuments and memorials in Kyiv
Statues in Ukraine
Destroyed sculptures
1946 sculptures
Monuments and memorials to Vladimir Lenin
Russians in Ukraine
Sculptures in the Soviet Union
Buildings and structures demolished in 2013
Vandalized works of art in Ukraine
Decommunization in Ukraine
Outdoor sculptures in Ukraine
1946 establishments in Ukraine
2013 disestablishments in Ukraine
Sculptures of men in Ukraine
Lenin, Vladimir in Kyiv
Statues removed in 2013